The Mental Health Review Tribunal of New South Wales is a specialist tribunal dealing with mental health issues in New South Wales, a state of Australia.  It has exclusive jurisdiction in terms of most mental health issues, although it may share jurisdiction on some issue with other courts, such as the Supreme Court of New South Wales.  The tribunal came into existence on 3 September 1990.

Constitution

The acts give the tribunal a wide range of powers deal with the treatment and care of people with a mental illness.

The Governor of New South Wales may appoint a president of the tribunal. The president is a full-time position and the office-holder is expected to devote the whole of their time to the role. The current President, since June 2012, is Professor Daniel Howard. The governor may also appoint deputy presidents of the tribunal.  These roles may be full-time or part-time.  At present, there are two deputy presidents appointed. Presidents and deputy presidents must either be lawyers or former judicial officers.

The governor may also appoint members of the tribunal.  These members can be either full-time or part-time members, although the tendency is to appoint part-time members.  Members are usually appointed for a one-year term. Members are chosen because of their experience in mental health issues, and may be psychiatrists or persons with a suitable qualification or experience in the area. As at 31 December 2005 there were 103 part-time members, comprising 33 legal members, 31 psychiatrists and 39 other suitably qualified members.

Jurisdiction
It may also have jurisdiction to deal with cases under other laws. The tribunal has jurisdiction in respect of:

the release or disposition of persons acquitted of crimes by reason of mental illness;
whether a person is fit for further trial after a jury has found the person unfit for trial;
reviewing the cases of detained patients (both civil and forensic) to determine whether they should continue to be detained;
hearing appeals against a medical superintendent's refusal to discharge a patient;
making, varying and revoking community treatment and community counselling orders;
determining applications for treatments and surgery on detained patients; and
making orders for financial management where people are unable to make competent decisions for
themselves because of psychiatric disability.

In certain circumstances, an appeal may be lodged against the decision of the tribunal in either the NSW Civil and Administrative Tribunal or the Supreme Court of New South Wales.

Hearings

The Tribunal conducts hearings for people living outside these areas either by videoconference or by telephone.

A person may have a lawyer to represent him or her at a hearing. In some cases, non-lawyers can represent a person with the permission of the tribunal.

In 2005 the Tribunal conducted 9,389 hearings.

See also

List of New South Wales courts and tribunals

References

External links

Mental health law in Australia
New South Wales courts and tribunals
New South Wales
Medical and health organisations based in New South Wales
Courts and tribunals established in 1990